10th Anniversary is the twenty-first studio album by American country music group The Statler Brothers. It was released in 1980 via Mercury Records. The album peaked at number 13 on the Billboard Top Country Albums chart.

Track listing
"Don't Forget Yourself" (Don Reid) – 2:51
"The Kid's Last Fight" (Bob Merrill) – 3:18
"How Are Things in Clay, Kentucky?" (D. Reid, Harold Reid) – 4:00
"One Less Day To Go" (D. Reid, H. Reid) – 2:29
"Nobody Wants To Be Country" (D. Reid, H. Reid) – 2:43
"We Got Paid By Cash" (D. Reid, H. Reid) – 3:35
"Old Cheerleaders Cry" (D. Reid, Kim Reid) – 3:00
"'Til The End" (D. Reid) – 3:05
"Nobody's Darling But Mine" (Jimmie Davis) – 3:06
"Charlotte's Web" (Cliff Crofford, Johnny Durrill, Snuff Garrett) – 2:55

Chart performance

References

1980 albums
The Statler Brothers albums
Mercury Records albums
Albums produced by Jerry Kennedy